The Diósi–Penrose model was introduced as a possible solution to the measurement problem, where the wave function collapse is related to gravity. The model was first suggested by Lajos Diósi when studying how possible gravitational fluctuations may affect the dynamics of quantum systems. Later, following a different line of reasoning, R. Penrose arrived at an estimation for the collapse time of a superposition due to gravitational effects, which is the same (within an unimportant numerical factor) as that found by Diósi, hence the name Diósi–Penrose model. However, it should be pointed out that while Diósi gave a precise dynamical equation for the collapse, Penrose took a more conservative approach, estimating only the collapse time of a superposition.

The Diósi model  

In the Diósi model, the wave-function collapse is induced by the interaction of the system with a classical noise field, where the spatial correlation function of this noise is related to the Newtonian potential. The evolution of the state vector  deviates from the Schrödinger equation and has the typical structure of the collapse models equations:

where

 
would lead to divergences in the predictions of the model, e.g. an infinite collapse rate or increase of energy. Typically, two different distributions for the mass density  have been considered in the literature: a spherical or a Gaussian mass density profile, given respectively by
 
and
 

The noise field  in Eq. () has zero average and correlation given by

where “” denotes the average over the noise. Similarly to other collapse models, the Diósi–Penrose model shares the following two features:
 The model describes a collapse in position.
 There is an amplification mechanism, which guarantees that more massive objects localize more effectively.

In order to show these features, it is convenient to write the master equation for the statistical operator  corresponding to Eq. ():

It is interesting to point out that this master equation has more recently re-derived by L. Diósi using an hybrid approach where quantized massive particles interact with classical gravitational fields.

with 
where
 
is the mass density when the particles of the system are centered at the points , ..., . Eq. () can be solved exactly, and one gets

where

As expected, for the diagonal terms of the density matrix, when , one has , i.e. the time of decay goes to infinity, implying that states with well-localized position are not affected by the collapse. On the contrary, the off-diagonal terms , which are different from zero when a spatial superposition is involved, will decay with a time of decay given by Eq. ().

To get an idea of the scale at which the gravitationally induced collapse becomes relevant, one can compute the time of decay in Eq. () for the case of a sphere with radius  and mass  in a spatial superposition at a distance . Then the time of decay can be computed) using Eq. () with

where . On the contrary, for a dust grain with  kg and  m, one gets one gets  s. Therefore, contrary to what might be expected considering the weaknesses of gravitational force, the effects of the gravity-related collapse become relevant already at the mesoscopic scale.

Recently, the model have been generalized by including dissipative and non-Markovian effects.

Penrose's proposal 

It is well known that general relativity and quantum mechanics, our most fundamental theories for describing the universe, are not compatible, and the unification of the two is still missing. The standard approach to overcome this situation is to try to modify general relativity by quantizing gravity. Penrose suggests an opposite approach, what he calls “gravitization of quantum mechanics”, where quantum mechanics gets modified when gravitational effects become relevant. The reasoning underlying this approach is the following one: take a massive system well-localized states in space. In this case, being the state well-localized, the induced space–time curvature is well defined. According to quantum mechanics, because of the superposition principle, the system can be placed (at least in principle) in a superposition of two well-localized states, which would lead to a superposition of two different space–times. The key idea is that since space–time metric should be well defined, nature “dislikes” these space–time superpositions and suppresses them by collapsing the wave function to one of the two localized states.

To set these ideas on a more quantitative ground, Penrose suggested that a way for measuring the difference between two space–times, in the Newtonian limit, is

The acceleration  can be written in terms of the corresponding gravitational potentials , i.e. .

The corresponding decay time can be obtained by the Heisenberg time–energy uncertainty:

which, apart for a factor  simply due to the use of different conventions, is exactly the same as the time decay  derived by Diósi's model. This is the reason why the two proposals are named together as the Diósi–Penrose model.

More recently, Penrose suggested a new and quite elegant way to justify the need for a gravity-induced collapse, based on avoiding tensions between the superposition principle and the equivalence principle, the cornerstones of quantum mechanics and general relativity. In order to explain it, let us start by comparing the evolution of a generic state in the presence of uniform gravitational acceleration . One way to perform the calculation, what Penrose calls “Newtonian perspective”, consists in working in an inertial frame, with space–time coordinates  and solve the Schrödinger equation in presence of the potential  (typically, one chooses the coordinates in such a way that the acceleration  is directed along the  axis, in which case ). This is what Penrose calls “Einsteinian perspective”. The solution  obtained in the Einsteinian perspective and the one  obtained in the Newtonian perspective are related to each other by

Being the two wave functions equivalent apart for an overall phase, they lead to the same physical predictions, which implies that there are no problems in this situation, when the gravitational field has always a well-defined value. However, if the space–time metric is not well defined, then we will be in a situation where there is a superposition of a gravitational field corresponding to the acceleration  and one corresponding to the acceleration . This does not create problems as far as one sticks to the Newtonian perspective. Here is where the gravity-induced collapse plays a role, collapsing the superposition when the first term of the phase  becomes too large.

Further information on Penrose's idea for the gravity-induced collapse can be also found in the Penrose interpretation.

Experimental tests and theoretical bounds 
Since the Diósi–Penrose model predicts deviations from standard quantum mechanics, the model can be tested. All bounds present in the literature are based on an indirect effect of the gravitational-related collapse: a Brownian-like diffusion induced by the collapse on the motion of the particles. This Brownian-like diffusion is a common feature of all objective-collapse theories and, typically, allows to set the strongest bounds on the parameters of these models. Then the bound has been further restricted to  m by the analysis of the data from gravitational wave detectors. and later to  m by studying the heating of neutron stars.

Regarding direct interferometric tests of the model, where a system is prepared in a spatial superposition, there are two proposals currently considered: an optomechanical setup with a mesoscopic mirror to be placed in a superposition by a laser, and experiments involving superpositions of Bose–Einstein condensates.

See also

 Measurement problem
 Interpretation of quantum mechanics
 Penrose interpretation
 Gravitational decoherence
 Wave function collapse
 Objective-collapse theory
 Ghirardi–Rimini–Weber theory

References 

Quantum measurement
Interpretations of quantum mechanics